Muhammad Nur Syaiful bin Zulkafli (born 19 February 1995) is a Malaysian Paralympic swimmer. He represented Malaysia at the 2020 Summer Paralympics held in Tokyo, Japan. In 2019, he competed at the 2019 World Para Swimming Championships held in London, United Kingdom and won bronze medal in the 50m Freestyle S5 event. In 2022, he competed at the 2022 World Para Swimming Championships held in Madeira, Portugal and won bronze medal in the 50m Freestyle S5 event.

References

External links
 

People from Sarawak
1995 births
Living people
Swimmers at the 2020 Summer Paralympics
Malaysian male freestyle swimmers
Paralympic swimmers of Malaysia
Medalists at the World Para Swimming Championships
S5-classified Paralympic swimmers
Medalists at the 2018 Asian Para Games